The women's 200m individual medley SM8 event at the 2008 Summer Paralympics took place at the Beijing National Aquatics Center on 11 September. There were two heats; the swimmers with the eight fastest times advanced to the final.

Results

Heats
Competed from 10:01.

Heat 1

Heat 2

Final
Competed at 17:55.

Q = qualified for final. WR = World Record. PR = Paralympic Record.

References
 
 

Swimming at the 2008 Summer Paralympics
2008 in women's swimming